David Mack may refer to:

 David Mack (police officer) (born 1961), professional runner, police officer, and bank robber
 David Mack (politician) (born 1953), South Carolina politician
 David Mack (rower), American lightweight rower
 David Alan Mack, American television scriptwriter and novelist
 David Lyle Mack, American diplomat 
 David S. Mack (born 1941), American businessman
 David W. Mack (born 1972), American comic book artist and writer